The John McGee House, near Cornishville, Kentucky, United States, was built around 1790.  It was listed on the National Register of Historic Places in 1983.

It is a two-story hall parlor plan dry stone house with two bays on its second floor and three bays on its first.  It was built by American Revolutionary War soldier John McGee (b. 1730) who moved to Kentucky in 1775.  He owned .

It is a "good example" of an "early stone house".  A one-story ell was added around 1825.

It includes some element of Federal style.

A second contributing building is a "dairy", which is a root cellar with a granary above.

References

National Register of Historic Places in Mercer County, Kentucky
Federal architecture in Kentucky
Houses completed in 1790
1790 establishments in Virginia
Houses in Mercer County, Kentucky
Hall-parlor plan architecture in the United States
Stone houses in Kentucky
Pre-statehood history of Kentucky